Evgeni Zyumbulev (Bulgarian: Евгени Зюмбулев; born 1 September 1988) is a Bulgarian footballer who plays as a defender for Kyustendil.

References

External links
 

1988 births
Living people
Bulgarian footballers
Association football defenders
FC Strumska Slava Radomir players
FC Tsarsko Selo Sofia players
FC Lokomotiv 1929 Sofia players
FC CSKA 1948 Sofia players
FC Vitosha Bistritsa players
First Professional Football League (Bulgaria) players
People from Kyustendil
Sportspeople from Kyustendil Province